Dr. Daulatrao Aher (1 November 1943-19 January 2016) was an Indian politician who was a member of the 9th Lok Sabha. He represented the Nashik constituency of Maharashtra and was a member of the Bharatiya Janata Party (BJP) political party.

References

External links
 

India MPs 1989–1991
People from Nashik
Marathi politicians
Bharatiya Janata Party politicians from Maharashtra
Maharashtra MLAs 1985–1990
Maharashtra MLAs 1999–2004
Maharashtra MLAs 1995–1999
1943 births
2016 deaths